Ciprian Mircea Manea (born 13 August 1980) is a Romanian former professional footballer who played as a goalkeeper for teams such as Laminorul Roman, FCM Bacău or Politehnica Iași, among others.

References

External links
 
 

1980 births
Living people
People from Roman, Romania
Romanian footballers
Association football goalkeepers
Liga I players
Liga II players
CSM Roman (football) players
FCM Bacău players
FC Vaslui players
FC Politehnica Iași (2010) players
Azadegan League players
Gostaresh Foulad F.C. players
Romanian expatriate footballers
Romanian expatriate sportspeople in Iran
Expatriate footballers in Iran